Robin Figren (born March 7, 1988) is a Swedish former professional ice hockey player. Figren was selected 70th overall in the third round of the 2006 NHL Entry Draft by the New York Islanders.

Playing career
Figren played junior hockey with Swedish team Frölunda HC. After impressive performances in the J20 SuperElit, Robin played 2 games as a 17-year-old in the Elitserien. After the draft Figren played in the Western Hockey League for the Calgary Hitmen and Edmonton Oil Kings.

In the 2008–09 season, Figren played his first professional season, returning to the Elitserien with Djurgårdens IF. Upon the completion of Djurgården season he was assigned to the Islanders AHL affiliate, the Bridgeport Sound Tigers to finish the year.

On April 20, 2011, Figren left the Islanders organization and returned to Sweden, signing a one-year with Linköpings HC of the Elitserien. After four seasons with Frölunda HC, including capturing the Le Mat trophy in the 2015–16 season, Figren left the club as a free agent following the 2016–17 season, agreeing to a two-year contract with current champions, HV71, on May 10, 2017.

On June 24, 2019, Figren joined EHC Kloten of the Swiss League (SL) on a one-year deal. Figren remained with Kloten for three seasons, establishing himself as an offensive leader on the club and helping the team gain promotion and return to the National League in the 2021–22 season before announcing his retirement from professional hockey on 18 August 2022. 

Figren was well known for his "zorro" goal for Sweden in the 2008 WJC tournament.

Career statistics

Regular season and playoffs

International

Awards and honors

References

External links

1988 births
Living people
Bridgeport Sound Tigers players
Calgary Hitmen players
Djurgårdens IF Hockey players
Frölunda HC players
HV71 players
EHC Kloten players
Linköping HC players
New York Islanders draft picks
Ice hockey people from Stockholm
Swedish ice hockey right wingers